HD 218061 is a class K4III (orange giant) star in the constellation Aquarius. Its apparent magnitude is 6.16 and it is approximately 650 light years away based on parallax.

It has a companion B of apparent magnitude 11.4 and separation 55.1", corresponding to roughly absolute magnitude 4.9 and a separation of 11000 AU if the distance from Earth is the same.

References

Aquarius (constellation)
K-type giants
Durchmusterung objects
218061
113998
8783